Tambourine is the second album by alternative country artist Tift Merritt. It was released in 2004 by Lost Highway Records, and earned her a Grammy nomination for Best Country Album.

Track listing

Personnel

 Tift Merritt – vocals, Wurlitzer
 Mike Campbell – guitar, pump organ
 Jason Sinay – guitar
 Robert Randolph – pedal steel guitar
 Lance Morrison – bass
 Benmont Tench – melodica, Wurlitzer
 Brandon Bush – Farfisa organ, Hammond B-3
 Don Heffington – drums
 Zeke Hutchins – tom toms
 George Drakoulias – percussion
 Patrick Warren – chamberlain, celeste
 Joseph Sublett, Darrell Leonard, Gregory H. Smith – horns
 Neal Casal, Margaret Fowler, Jim Gilstrap, Lani Groves, Ellis Hall, Gary Louris, Maxayn Lewis, Maria McKee, Tata Vega, Julia Waters, Maxine Waters, Oren Waters, – background vocals
Technical
 Jim Scott, Ryan Hewitt – recording engineer
 Jim Scott, David Bianco – mixing
 Richard Dodd – mastering
 Roberto D'este, Neal Casal – photography
 Bethany Newman – art direction and design
 Bethany Newman – design

References

2004 albums
Tift Merritt albums
albums produced by George Drakoulias
Lost Highway Records albums
Albums recorded at Sound City Studios